Stožice Stadium is a multi-purpose stadium located in Ljubljana, Slovenia. It was designed by Slovenian Sadar + Vuga architects and is the biggest football stadium in the country. It is one of two main stadiums in the city and lies in the Bežigrad district, north of the city centre. The stadium is part of the Stožice Sports Park sports complex.

The stadium is the home ground of the football club Olimpija Ljubljana and is the main venue of the Slovenia national football team. In addition to football, the stadium is also intended for cultural events.

History
The stadium was named after the area in which it is located, and the change of the name is possible in the future due to sponsorship rights. Together with an indoor arena, it is a part of the Stožice Sports Park. The stadium building area measures 24.614 square metres. It was constructed in 14 months and was opened on 11 August 2010 in a football friendly match between the national teams of Slovenia and Australia, won by Slovenia 2–0.

The stadium has a capacity of 16,038 seats and is laid out under the plateau of the park. The stadium also has 558 VIP seats and 97 spots for people with disabilities. The stadium's press area can accommodate 210 journalists. As a structure, the stadium is 'sunk' into the park. Only the roof over the stands rises above the plane of the park as a monolithic crater.

For cultural purposes such as music concerts, the stadium capacity is increased to over 20,000.

Football 
The stadium is mainly used for football and is the home ground of football club Olimpija Ljubljana. In addition, the stadium is also the home venue of the Slovenia national football team, and has hosted a total of 43 national team matches as of 20 November 2022. In 2021, the stadium was one of the eight hosts of the 2021 UEFA European Under-21 Championship, and also hosted the final match between Germany and Portugal.

Culture
Although the stadium was primarily built for football it is also planned to host many cultural events. The first was a joint project of two comedians, Lado Bizovičar and Jurij Zrnec, that was titled Notpadu lajv?!, on 20 September 2010. Over 20,000 people gathered on this event.

Records
On 11 August 2010, at the stadium opening, 16,135 people gathered for the match between Slovenia and Australia, which is the highest attendance of any football match in Slovenia since the country's independence in 1991.

See also
List of football stadiums in Slovenia

References

External links
 

 

Football venues in Slovenia
Stadium
Music venues in Slovenia
Sports venues in Ljubljana
Multi-purpose stadiums in Slovenia
Music venues completed in 2010
Sports venues completed in 2010
Bežigrad District
2010 establishments in Slovenia
21st-century architecture in Slovenia